Dejan Lazarević (born 15 February 1990) is a Slovenian professional footballer who plays as a winger.

Club career

Jagiellonia Białystok
On 18 January 2018, Lazarević signed a two-and-a-half-year contract with Jagiellonia Białystok.

Legnago Salus
On 31 January 2021, he joined Italian third-tier Serie C club Legnago Salus.

Career statistics

International

Scores and results list Slovenia's goal tally first, score column indicates score after each Lazarević goal.

References

External links
Dejan Lazarević at 90minut.pl 

NZS profile 

1990 births
Living people
Slovenian people of Serbian descent
Footballers from Ljubljana
Slovenian footballers
Association football wingers
Serie A players
Serie B players
Serie C players
Genoa C.F.C. players
Torino F.C. players
Calcio Padova players
Modena F.C. players
A.C. ChievoVerona players
U.S. Sassuolo Calcio players
F.C. Legnago Salus players
Süper Lig players
Antalyaspor footballers
Kardemir Karabükspor footballers
Ekstraklasa players
Jagiellonia Białystok players
Slovenian PrvaLiga players
NK Domžale players
Slovenian expatriate footballers
Slovenian expatriate sportspeople in Italy
Expatriate footballers in Italy
Slovenian expatriate sportspeople in Turkey
Expatriate footballers in Turkey
Slovenian expatriate sportspeople in Poland
Expatriate footballers in Poland
Slovenia youth international footballers
Slovenia under-21 international footballers
Slovenia international footballers